Club Deportivo Alquerías was a Spanish football team based in Alquerías, in the autonomous community of Murcia. Founded in 1992 and dissolved in 2010, it held home games at Estadio Los Pinos which had a capacity of 500 spectators.

History
From 1996 to 2002, Alquerías played in the fourth division. Its seventh and final season in the fourth tier was in 2007–08.

In the summer of 2010 the club folded, selling its place to the newly-formed Águilas FC.

Season-by-season record

7 seasons in Tercera División

References

Association football clubs established in 1992
Association football clubs disestablished in 2010
Defunct football clubs in the Region of Murcia
1992 establishments in Spain
2010 disestablishments in Spain